Elizabeth of Nevers (born: after 24 August 1439 in Nevers; died: 21 June 1483) was Duchess of Cleves from 1455 until her death, due to her marriage with John I of Cleves-Mark.  She was the matriarch of the house of Cleves-Nevers, and thus the Cleves line of the Counts and dukes of Nevers.  Because the territory was part of her inheritance, it fell to her son Engelbert after her death.

Life 
Elizabeth was the oldest child of John II, Count of Étampes, Nevers, Rethel and Eu, and his first wife Jacqueline d'Ailly.  Since Elizabeth's younger brother died at the age of five years and her father thus had no sons, he appointed his eldest daughter to the heir of the counties of Nevers and Eu.

On 22 April 1456, she married in Bruges with her third cousin, Duke John I of Cleves.  After the marriage of Mary of Burgundy with Adolph I of Cleves, this was the second marriage between the House of Burgundy and the House of La Marck.  These marriages made the Duchy of Cleves into a kind of Burgundian annexe for the next 100 years, which was reflected mainly in the cultural life.  The courtly life, but also the administrative practice in the territory of the Duke of Cleves increasingly followed the Burgundian example.

After the death of Adolf of Egmond, Duke of Guelders, both Adolf's sister, Catherine, and Emperor Maximilian I claimed the Duchy of Guelders.   The Emperor's claim was based on his marriage with Mary of Burgundy.  When her husband went to Guelders to support the Emperor's claim, Elizabeth led the government in Cleves during his absence.

Elizabeth died on 21 June 1483 before her father. Her claims to the counties of Nevers and Eu were  inherited by her third son Engelbert, who founded the Cleves-Nevers line.  She was buried in the Collegiate Church of St. Mary in Cleves, where she shares a grave with her husband.  The grave is covered with engraved and gilded copper plates.  The top plate, commissioned by Charles of Egmond, depicts the two deceased and is one of the few pictures of Elizabeth.  The tomb is considered one of the most important artifacts of its kind.

Marriage and issue 
Elizabeth and John I had six children:
 John II (born: 13 April 1458; died: 15 March 1521), Duke of Cleves, married on 3 November 1489 with Matilda of Hesse
 Adolph (born:28 April 1461; died: 4 April 1498), a canon of Liege
 Engelbert (born: 26 September 1462; died: 21 November 1506), Count of Nevers and Eu, married on 23 February 1489 with Charlotte de Bourbon
 Dietrich (born: 29 June 1464; died young)
 Marie (born: 8 August 1465; died: 7 October 1513)
 Philip (born: 1 January 1467; died: 5 March 1505), Bishop of Nevers (1500-1505), Amiens (1501-1503), and Autun (1505)

Ancestry

External links 
 Marriage certificate of Elisabeth of Burgundy and John of Cleves

Footnotes 

Duchesses of Burgundy
Duchesses of Cleves
House of Valois-Burgundy-Nevers
15th-century French people
15th-century births
Year of birth uncertain
1483 deaths
Medieval French nobility
15th-century French women